The Thailand motorcycle Grand Prix is a Motorcycle Grand Prix event that started in 2018. The race is hosted at Buriram International Circuit near the eponymous city in Buriram Province. In 2020 and 2021, the race was cancelled due to the COVID-19 pandemic. The event is due to take place at the Buriram International Circuit until at least 2026.

Official names and sponsors
2018–2019: PTT Thailand Grand Prix
2022–present: OR Thailand Grand Prix

Winners of the Thailand Grand Prix

Multiple winners (riders)

Multiple winners (manufacturers)

Multiple winners (countries)

By year

References

External links
Buriram International Circuit official website

 
Motorsport competitions in Thailand
Recurring sporting events established in 2018
2018 establishments in Thailand